The Harriet and Thomas Beare House is a Victorian house located on Reeves Drive in the Near Southside Historic District of Grand Forks, North Dakota. The Harriet and Thomas Beare House was added to the National Register of Historic Places in 1995. It is also known as the Margaret E. Bowler Murphy and Michael F. Murphy House.

History
The house was built in 1901 for real estate investor Thomas Beare. In 1903, he sold the home to state senator and Grand Forks Mayor Michael F. Murphy (1858-1930) and his wife Margaret Bowler Murphy (1857–1917). They enlarged and remodeled the residence, building an addition for their family. 
The house was located on the most prestigious residential street in Grand Forks, and exemplifies the conspicuous consumption of the cities' elite during the Progressive Era and the growth of the Second Dakota Boom (1889-1915).

The house is a significant example of the Queen Anne style with elements taken from the Classical Revival style. Queen Anne details include decorative chimneys, complexity of roof shapes such as conical turrets and hipped roof dormers, finials, and fish-scale shingled gable ends. The house is a relatively simple expression of the style and shows signs of transition into the Classical Revival style in its symmetrical facade, Ionic columns, Doric details, and regular footprint. A notable feature is the Porte-cochere which is fairly rare in Grand Forks.

References

Houses on the National Register of Historic Places in North Dakota
Queen Anne architecture in North Dakota
Neoclassical architecture in North Dakota
Houses completed in 1901
Houses in Grand Forks, North Dakota
National Register of Historic Places in Grand Forks, North Dakota
1901 establishments in North Dakota